Eretmocera aurovittata is a moth of the family Scythrididae. It was described by Arnold Pagenstecher in 1900. It is found on the Bismarck Islands.

References

aurovittata
Moths described in 1900